Moshe Safdie   (born July 14, 1938) is an architect, urban planner, educator, theorist, and author, with Israeli, Canadian, and American citizenship. He is known for incorporating principles of socially responsible design in his 50-year career. His projects include cultural, educational, and civic institutions; neighborhoods and public parks; housing; mixed-use urban centers; airports; and master plans for existing communities and entirely new cities in North and South America, the Middle East, and Asia. He is most identified with designing Marina Bay Sands and Jewel Changi Airport, as well as his debut project, Habitat 67, originally conceived as his thesis at McGill University.

Early life and education 
Moshe Safdie was born in Haifa, British Mandate of Palestine, in 1938, to a Sephardic Jewish family of Syrian-Jewish and Lebanese-Jewish descent. He was nine years old, living in Haifa, when, on May 14, 1948, David Ben-Gurion proclaimed the Declaration of the Establishment of the State of Israel. Safdie attended Reali High School. He lived on a kibbutz, working in the countryside. He tended goats and kept bees. In 1953, the Israeli government restricted imports in response to an economic and currency crisis, which severely affected Safdie's father's textile business. Consequently, when Safdie was 15, his family emigrated to Montreal. There, he attended Westmount High School.

In September 1955, he registered for the six-year architectural degree program at the McGill University Faculty of Engineering. In his fifth year, Safdie was named University Scholar. The following summer, he was awarded the Canada Mortgage and Housing Corporation (CMHC) Scholarship. He traveled across North America to observe housing developments in major cities. In his final year, Safdie developed his thesis, entitled "A Case for City Living" and described as "A Three-Dimensional Modular Building System". He received his degree in 1961. Two years later, while apprenticing with Louis Kahn, Safdie at age 23 was invited by his thesis advisor, Sandy van Ginkel, to submit his modular project for the World Exposition of 1967, to be held in Montreal. Constructed permanently there, it became known as Habitat 67.

Career 
In 1964, Safdie established Safdie Architects in Montreal to undertake work on Habitat 67, an adaptation of his thesis at McGill University.  Habitat 67 was selected by Canada as a central feature of Expo 67; it pioneered the design and implementation of three-dimensional, prefabricated units for living. Safdie designed the complex as a neighborhood with open spaces, garden terraces, and many other amenities typically reserved for the single-family home, and adapted to a high-density urban environment.

In 1970, Safdie established a branch office of his practice in Jerusalem. During this period, Safdie combined his interests in social activism and advanced technologies with respect for historic and regional context. He worked on the restoration of the Old City and the construction of Mamilla Center, linking old and new cities. Other significant works in Israel include the New City of Modi’in, the Yad Vashem Holocaust History Museum, Yitzhak Rabin Center for Israel Studies, Ben Gurion International Airport, National Campus for the Archeology of Israel, multiple projects for Hebrew Union College, and others. During this period, Safdie also worked with leaders in Senegal and Iran.

Later, Safdie received commissions for public buildings in Canada: the National Gallery of Canada, the Quebec Museum of Civilization, and Vancouver Library Square. Other notable cultural works include the Khalsa Heritage Memorial Complex, the national museum of the Sikh people in Punjab, India; the United States Institute of Peace Headquarters on the Mall in Washington, DC; the Kauffman Center for the Performing Arts in Kansas City, Missouri; and the Crystal Bridges Museum of American Art in Bentonville, Arkansas.

Safdie has worked on projects in emerging markets, and brought projects to completion in shorter time spans, at larger scales. including: Marina Bay Sands, a mixed-use resort integrated with Singapore's iconic Skypark; Jewel Changi Airport, a new community-centric airport typology combining marketplace and garden; and Raffles City Chongqing, a mixed-use development featuring over one million square meters of housing, office, retail, transportation, and hotel programs. To connect four towers in Chongqing, China, he designed a skybridge that has been referred to as the world's longest "Horizontal Skyscraper." Safdie and his team have used skybridges and multi-level connectivity in other projects to make skyscrapers more accessible.

Practice
Today, Safdie Architects is headquartered in Boston, Massachusetts, with offices in Jerusalem, Toronto, Shanghai, and Singapore. The business is organized as a partnership. 

Within his office, Safdie formed a research program to pursue advanced investigation of design topics. The practice-oriented fellowship explores speculative ideas outside normal business practice constraints. Fellows work independently with Safdie and firm principals to formulate specific proposals and research plans. The salaried position is located in-residence, with full access to project teams and outside consultants. Past fellowships include Habitat of the Future, Mobility on Demand, and Tall Buildings in the City.

Academia 
In 1978, after teaching at McGill, Ben Gurion, and Yale universities, Safdie was appointed Director of the Urban Design Program at Harvard University's Graduate School of Design (GSD) and moved to Boston, Massachusetts. He served as Director until 1984. From 1984 to 1989, he was the Ian Woodner Professor of Architecture and Urban Design at Harvard. Safdie continues to work closely with the GSD, frequently teaching design studio; Notably, Rethinking the Humanist High-Rise (2019) and Rethinking Hudson Yards (2017).

Personal life 
In 1959, Safdie married Nina Nusynowicz, a Polish-Israeli Holocaust survivor. Safdie and Nusynowicz have two children, a daughter and son, born during the inception and erection of Habitat 67. Just before the opening, Safdie and his young family moved into the development. His daughter Taal is an architect in San Diego, a partner of the firm Safdie Rabines Architects; His son Oren is a playwright who has written several plays about architecture. Safdie's great-nephews, Josh and Benny, are independent filmmakers. Safdie and Nusynowicz divorced in 1981.

In 1981, Safdie married Michal Ronnen, a Jerusalem-born photographer and daughter of artist Vera Ronnen. Safdie and Ronnen have two daughters, Carmelle and Yasmin. Carmelle is an artist, and Yasmin is a social worker.

Recognition
 2020: Genius Award, Liberty Science Center`
 2020: Lynn S. Beedle Lifetime Achievement Award, Council on Tall Buildings and Urban Habitat (CTBUH)
 2019: Honorary Doctorate, Technion – Israel Institute of Technology
 2019: Wolf Prize in Architecture, International Wolf Foundation
 2018: Lifetime Achievement Award, Design Futures Council
 2017: Honorary Doctorate, Ben-Gurion University of the Negev
 2015: Gold Medal, American Institute of Architects
 2012: Medaille du Merite, Ordre des architectes du Québec
 2005: Companion Order of Canada, Governor General-in-Council of Canada
 2003: Lifetime Achievement Award, YIVO Institute for Jewish Research
 2002: Honorary Fellow, Royal Incorporation of Architects in Scotland
 2001: Honorary Doctorate, Hebrew College
 1997: Jewish Cultural Achievement Award in the Visual Arts, National Foundation for Jewish Culture
 1996: Honorary Doctorate in Engineering, Technical University of Nova Scotia
 1996: Academy Member, American Academy of Arts and Sciences
 1995: Gold Medal, Royal Architectural Institute of Canada
 1995: College of Fellows, American Institute of Architects
 1993: Richard Neutra Award for Professional Excellence, California State Polytechnic University, Pomona
 1989: Honorary Doctorate in Fine Arts, University of Victoria
 1988: Honorary Doctorate in Sciences, Laval University
 1987: Mt. Scopus Award for Humanitarianism, Hebrew University of Jerusalem
 1986: The Order of Canada, Governor General-in-Council of Canada
 1982: Honorary Doctor of Law, McGill University
 1982: Tau Sigma Delta Gold Medal for Distinction in Design, Tau Sigma Delta Grand Chapter
 1961: Lieutenant Governor's Gold Medal for Exceptional Merit, Lieutenant Governor of Québec

Exhibitions
 2017: Habitat 67 vers l’avenir: The Shape of Things to Come, Université du Québec à Montréal
 2010–2014: Global Citizen: The Architecture of Moshe Safdie, National Gallery of Canada, Ottawa, Ontario, Canada / Skirball Cultural Center, Los Angeles, California / Crystal Bridges Museum of American Art, Bentonville, Arkansas, USA
 2012–2013: Moshe Safdie: The Path to Crystal Bridges, Crystal Bridges Museum of American Art, Bentonville, Arkansas, USA
 2004: An Architect's Vision: Moshe Safdie’s Jepson Center for the Arts, Telfair Museum of Art, Savannah, Georgia, USA
 2003–2004: Building a New Museum, Peabody Essex Museum, Salem, Massachusetts, USA
 1998: Moshe Safdie, Museum Architecture 1971–1998, Tel Aviv University, Tel Aviv, Israel
 1989: Moshe Safdie, Projects: 1979–1989, Harvard University Graduate School of Design, Cambridge, Massachusetts, USA
 1985: The National Gallery of Canada, Harvard University Graduate School of Design, Cambridge, Massachusetts, USA / National Gallery of Canada, Ottawa, Ontario, Canada
 1982: Context, Traveling exhibit sponsored by New York Institute for the Humanities
 1973–1974: For Everyone A Garden, Baltimore Museum of Art, Baltimore, Maryland, USA / National Gallery of Canada, Ottawa, Ontario, Canada / San Francisco MoMA, San Francisco, California, USA

Films
 2020: "Moshe Safdie: Another Dimension of Architecture," I-Talk Productions
 2018: "Time Space Existence," Plane-Site
 2004: "Moshe Safdie: The Power of Architecture," Dir. Donald Winkler
 2003: "My Architect: A Son’s Journey," Dir. Nathaniel Kahn
 1997: "The Sound of the Carceri with Yo-Yo Ma," Dir. Francois Girard
 1973: "The Innocent Door" / "Coldspring New Town," National Film Board of Canada

Archives 
The Moshe Safdie Archive, donated to McGill University by the architect in 1990, is one of the most extensive individual collections of architectural documentation in Canada. Comprising material from 235 projects, the Moshe Safdie Archive records the progression of Safdie's career from his first unpublished university papers to Safdie Architects' current projects. The collection includes over 140,000 drawings, over 200 architectural models, extensive project files, audio visual and digital material, as well as over 100,000
project photos and travel slides, 215 personal sketchbooks, and 2,250 large sketches. Administered by the McGill University Library, a list of physical holdings are available to researchers.

Select projects

 1967: Habitat 67 at Expo 67 World's Fair, Montreal, Quebec, Canada
 1987: Musée de la Civilisation, Quebec City, Quebec, Canada
 1988: National Gallery of Canada, Ottawa, Ontario, Canada
 1989: New City of Modi'in, Israel
 1989: Esplanade Condominiums, Cambridge, Massachusetts, U.S. 
 1991: Montreal Museum of Fine Arts, Montreal, Quebec, Canada
 1992: The Class of 1959 Chapel, Harvard Business School, Boston, Massachusetts, U.S. 
 1994: John G. Diefenbaker Building, Ottawa, Ontario, Canada
 1994: Rosovsky Hall, Harvard University, Cambridge, Massachusetts, U.S.
 1995: Yad Vashem Children's and Deportees Memorials, Jerusalem
 1995: Vancouver Library Square, Vancouver, British Columbia, Canada
 1998: David Citadel Hotel and David's Village, Jerusalem
 1998: Hebrew Union College, Jerusalem
 1999: Yitzhak Rabin Center for Israel Studies and Rabin Tomb, Tel Aviv, Israel
 2000: Exploration Place Science Museum, Wichita, Kansas, U.Sm
 2003: Peabody Essex Museum, Salem, Massachusetts, U.S. [12]
 2003: Salt Lake City Public Library, Salt Lake City, Utah, U.S.
 2003: Cairnhill Road Condominiums, Singapore
 2003: Eleanor Roosevelt College, University of California, San Diego, California, U.S.
 2004: Airside Building of Terminal 3, Ben Gurion International Airport, Tel Aviv, Israel
 2005: Yad Vashem Holocaust History Museum, Jerusalem
 2006: Jepson Center for the Arts at Telfair Museum of Art, Savannah, Georgia, U.S.
 2007: Terminal 1, Toronto Pearson International Airport, Toronto, Ontario, Canada 
 2008: United States Federal Courthouse, District of Massachusetts, Springfield, Massachusetts, U.S. 
 2008: Bureau of Alcohol, Tobacco, Firearms, and Explosives (ATF) Headquarters, Washington, D.C., U.S. 
 2009: Mamilla Center, Jerusalem
 2009: Mamilla Hotel, Jerusalem
 2010: Marina Bay Sands Integrated Resort, Singapore
 2010: ArtScience Museum, Marina Bay Sands, Singapore
 2011: United States Institute of Peace Headquarters, Washington, D.C., U.S.
 2011: Kauffman Center for the Performing Arts, Kansas City, Missouri, U.S.
 2011: Crystal Bridges Museum of American Art, Bentonville, Arkansas, U.S.
 2011: Khalsa Heritage Memorial Complex (Virasat-e-Khalsa), Anandpur Sahib, Punjab, India
 2013: Skirball Cultural Center, Los Angeles, California, U.S. 
 2012: Sky Habitat, Singapore
 2017: Eling Residences, Chongqing, PRC
 2017: Habitat Qinhuangdao, Qinhuangdao, PRC
 2019: National Campus for the Archaeology of Israel, Jerusalem
 2019: Monde Residential Development, Toronto, Ontario, Canada
 2019: Jewel Changi Airport, Singapore
 2020: Raffles City Chongqing, Chongqing, PRC 
 2021: Serena del Mar, Cartagena, Colombia 
 2021: Altair, Colombo, Sri Lanka

Works
 With Intention to Build: The Unrealized Concepts, Ideas, and Dreams of Moshe Safdie. Ed. Michael Crosbie. Melbourne, Victoria: Images Publishing Group, 2020. 
 Megascale, Order & Complexity. Ed. Michael Jemtrud. Montreal: McGill University School of Architecture, 2009. 
 The City After the Automobile: An Architect's Vision. With Wendy Kohn. New York: Basic Books; Toronto: Stoddart Publishing Co., 1997. 
 The Language and Medium of Architecture (lecture at Harvard University Graduate School of Design delivered November 15, 1989)
 Jerusalem: The Future of the Past. Boston: Houghton Mifflin, 1989. 
 Beyond Habitat by 20 Years. Ed. John Kettle. Montreal and Plattsburgh, NY: Tundra Books, 1987. 
 The Harvard Jerusalem Studio: Urban Designs for the Holy City]. Asst. eds. Rudy Barton and Uri Shetrit. Cambridge, MA: The MIT Press, 1985. 
 Form & Purpose. Ed. John Kettle. Boston: Houghton Mifflin, 1982. 
 Habitat Bill of Rights With Nader Ardalan, George Candilis, Balkrishna V. Doshi, and Josep Lluís Sert. Imperial Government of Iran Ministry of Housing, 1976. 
 For Everyone A Garden. Ed. Judith Wolin. Cambridge, MA: The MIT Press, 1974. 
 Beyond Habitat. Ed. John Kettle. Cambridge, MA: The MIT Press, 1970. 
 Habitat. Montreal: Tundra Books, 1967.

Works about Moshe Safdie
 Jewel Changi Airport. Melbourne, Victoria: Images Publishing Group, 2020. 
 Safdie. Mulgrave, Victoria: Images Publishing Group, 2014. 
 Reaching for the Sky: The Marina Bay Sands Singapore. Singapore: ORO Editions, 2013. 
 Peace Building: The Mission, Work, and Architecture of the United States Institute of Peace. Dalton, MA: The Studley Press, 2011. 
 Valentin, Nilda, ed. Moshe Safdie. Rome: Edizione Kappa, 2010. 
 Moshe Safdie I. Mulgrave, Victoria: Images Publishing Group, 2009. 
 Moshe Safdie II. Mulgrave, Victoria: Images Publishing Group, 2009. 
 Global Citizen: The Architecture of Moshe Safdie. New York:Scala Publishers, Ltd., 2007. 
 Yad Vashem: Moshe Safdie – The Architecture of Memory. Baden, Switzerland: Lars Müller Publishers, 2006. 
 Moshe Safdie, Museum Architecture 1971–1988. Tel Aviv: Genia Schreiber University Art Gallery, Tel Aviv University, 1998. 
 Kohn, Wendy, ed. Moshe Safdie. London: Academy Editions, 1996. 
 Moshe Safdie: Buildings and Projects, 1967–1992. Montreal: McGill-Queens University Press, 1996. 
 Rybczynski, Witold. A Place for Art: The Architecture of the National Gallery of Canada. Ottawa: National Gallery of Canada, 1993. 
 Montreal Museum of Fine Arts: Jean-Noël Desmarais Pavilion. Montreal: Montreal Museum of Arts, 1991.

Gallery

References

External links

 The Moshe Safdie Archive – McGill University 
 Safdie Architects
 TED All-Stars, Reinventing the Apartment Building Presentation, 2014
 Moshe Safdie, AIA Gold Medal Award Acceptance Speech, 2015
 The Power of Architecture, 2013
 On Ethics, Order and Complexity by Moshe Safdie, 2009

1938 births
Canadian architects
Canadian people of Syrian-Jewish descent
Canadian Sephardi Jews
Modernist architects
Canadian urban planners
Companions of the Order of Canada
Harvard University faculty
20th-century Israeli architects
Jewish architects
Jewish Canadian artists
Jewish Canadian writers
Israeli emigrants to Canada
Israeli Sephardi Jews
Canadian people of Lebanese-Jewish descent
Israeli people of Syrian-Jewish descent
20th-century Sephardi Jews
21st-century Mizrahi Jews
Living people
McGill School of Architecture alumni
Modernist architecture in Canada
People from Haifa
Structuralists
Urban designers
Urban theorists
Fellows of the American Institute of Architects
20th-century Mizrahi Jews
21st-century Sephardi Jews
Architectural theoreticians
Recipients of the AIA Gold Medal